Spirit Cave (Tham Phii Man) is an archaeological site in Pang Mapha district, Mae Hong Son Province, northwestern Thailand. It was occupied 12,000 to 7,000 uncalibrated radiocarbon years ago by prehistoric humans of the Hoabinhian culture.

Location 

It was excavated in the mid-1960s by Chester Gorman. Two other significant nearby sites are the Banyan Valley Cave and the Steep Cliff Cave.

Chronology 
Human presence at the site is documented from the Upper Paleolithic to the early Neolithic, but the primary occupation layers represent Hoabinhian hunter-gatherers. Radiocarbon dating of organic resin on some pottery sherds returned Late Neolithic-Bronze ages, at odds with Gorman's claims for the Palaeolithic age of the deposit. Radiocarbon dating of four freshwater crab (Indochinamon sp.) dactyls from Spirit Cave showed that they all date to the Early Holocene, consistent with Gorman's claims of occupation during the Pleistocene–Holocene transition.

Plant domestication 

Gorman  claims that the Spirit Cave included remains of Prunus (almond), Terminalia, Areca (betel), Vicia (broadbean) or Phaseolus, Pisum (pea) or Raphia lagenaria (bottle gourd), Trapa (Chinese water chestnut), Piper (pepper), Madhuca (butternut), Canarium, Aleurites (candle nut), and Cucumis (a cucumber type) in layers dating to around 9,800 to 8,500 years BCE. None of the recovered specimens differed from their wild phenotypes. He suggested that these may have been used as foods, condiments, stimulants, for lighting and that the leguminous plants in particular "point to a very early use of domesticated plants". He later wrote  that "Whether they are definitely early cultigens remains to be established... What is important, and what we can say definitely, is that the remains indicate the early, quite sophisticated use of particular species which are still culturally important in Southeast Asia".

In 1972 W.G. Solheim, as the director of the project of which Spirit Cave was part, published an article in Scientific American discussing the finds from Spirit Cave. While Solheim noted that the specimens may "merely be wild species gathered from the surrounding countryside", he claimed that the inhabitants at Spirit Cave had "an advanced knowledge of horticulture". Solheim's chronological chart suggests that "incipient agriculture" began about 20,000 years BCE in Southeast Asia. He also suggests that ceramic technology was invented at 13,000 years BCE although Spirit Cave does not have ceramics evident until after 6,800 years BCE.

Although Solheim concludes that his reconstruction is "largely hypothetical", his overstatement of the results of Gorman's excavation has led to inflated claims of Hoabinhian agriculture. These claims have detracted from the significance of Spirit Cave as a site with well-preserved evidence of human subsistence and palaeoenvironmental conditions during the Hoabinhian.

Lithics 
Gorman discussed cultural levels with respect to lithic artifacts and identified two layers at Spirit Cave. Course-grained quartzite was the most abundant stone found in both layers. The remains included large unifacially worked pebble cores aka sumatraliths, grinding stones, and retouched/utilized flakes.  Cultural level two consisted of new types of artifacts including flaked and polished quadrangular adzes and small ground/polished slate knives. He used the findings at Spirit Cave to argue the notion that the Hoabinhian culture was a techno-complex due to a response to similar ecological adaptations.

See also 
 List of caves
 Speleology

References

Sources
 

Archaeological sites in Thailand
Archaeological cultures of Southeast Asia
Caves of Thailand
Geography of Mae Hong Son province
Prehistoric Thailand